Anton Magnus Aure (15 January 1884 – 18 July 1924) was a Norwegian schoolteacher, bibliographer and book collector.

Personal life
Aure was born in Fræna to farmer Jakob Sivertson Aure and Beret Pedersdatter Orten. In 1911 he married Hallgerd Malmfrid Røsok (died 1913), and in 1918 he married Marta Johanne Aadna.

Career
Aure graduated as schoolteacher in 1911. Aside of his teaching job, he started to collect books written in Nynorsk. His extensive collection was basis for a bibliography of literature published in Nynorsk, and Aure was appointed government scholar in 1919. He started and edited the monthly magazine Ung-Norig in 1918. His publications include the poetry collection Lauv og lyng (1908), Kvinnor i den nynorske bokheimen (1916), Nynorsk boklista. Skrifter i bokform på norsk (two volumes, 1916 and 1921), Ungdom og bøker (1923), Norskt Bladmannalag gjenom 10 aar (1923, jointly with Hans Aarnes), and Prestar som talar nynorsk (1924). His collection of about 6,000 volumes was acquired by the publishing house Det Norske Samlaget after his death, and eventually administered by the National Library of Norway.

He died in Asker in 1924.

References

1884 births
1924 deaths
People from Fræna
Norwegian schoolteachers
Norwegian bibliographers
Norwegian book and manuscript collectors
Norwegian magazine editors
Nynorsk-language writers